Brian Coyne (born 13 December 1959) is a Scottish former professional football player and manager.  

Coyne played for Celtic in his native Glasgow before joining Shrewsbury Town in June 1979. However, he played just once for Shrewsbury, his only Football League side. He later had spells with Motherwell and Falkirk. 

No one  has been at the helm for more Welsh Premier matches than Coyne, who left Newtown in the summer of 2003 after a decade in charge at Latham Park and, to the surprise of many, joined Cwmbran Town as manager. He came into the club at a difficult time, after the death of Tony Wilcox, but after a slow start was able to build the Crows into a team contending for the top eight.

He guided Newtown to the runners-up spot in the League of Wales and into European competition.
Brian's teams have a reputation for playing football and producing outstanding talents such as Andy Cooke and Scott Ruscoe.
Coyne, who has also managed the Welsh semi-professional squad, quit Cwmbran in October 2005 following the cash crisis and was swiftly appointed manager at Aberystwyth Town when David Burrows decided to quit.

 Coyne stepped down as manager in September 2009.

References

External links
Brian Coyne Welsh Premier Profile

Living people
Footballers from Glasgow
Scottish footballers
Scottish football managers
Celtic F.C. players
Shrewsbury Town F.C. players
Motherwell F.C. players
Falkirk F.C. players
Cymru Premier managers
1959 births
Scottish Football League players
Aberystwyth Town F.C. managers
Newtown A.F.C. managers
Cwmbran Town F.C. managers
Association football midfielders